The Marojejy mantella (Mantella manery) is a species of frog in the family Mantellidae.
It is endemic to Madagascar.
Its natural habitats are subtropical or tropical moist lowland forests, rivers, swamps, and intermittent freshwater marshes.
It is threatened by habitat loss.

References

Mantella
Endemic frogs of Madagascar
Taxonomy articles created by Polbot
Amphibians described in 1999